Wedgefishes are rays of the family Rhinidae, comprising eleven species in three genera. Classified in the order Rhinopristiformes along with guitarfishes and sawfishes, they have also been known as giant guitarfishes or sharkfin guitarfishes.

Taxonomy
 Rhina Bloch & Schneider, 1801
 Rhina ancylostoma Bloch & Schneider, 1801 (Shark ray)
 Rhynchobatus J. P. Müller & Henle, 1837
 Rhynchobatus australiae Whitley, 1939 (Bottlenose wedgefish)
 Rhynchobatus cooki Last, Kyne & Compagno, 2016 (Roughnose wedgefish)
 Rhynchobatus djiddensis (Forsskål, 1775) (Whitespotted wedgefish)
 Rhynchobatus immaculatus Last, Ho & Chen, 2013 (Taiwanese wedgefish)
 Rhynchobatus laevis (Bloch & Schneider, 1801) (Smoothnose wedgefish)
 Rhynchobatus luebberti Ehrenbaum, 1915 (African wedgefish)
 Rhynchobatus mononoke Koeda, Itou, Yamada & Motomura, 2020 (Japanese wedgefish)
 Rhynchobatus palpebratus Compagno & Last, 2008 (Eyebrow wedgefish)
 Rhynchobatus springeri Compagno & Last, 2010 (Broadnose wedgefish)
 Rhynchorhina Séret & Naylor, 2016
 Rhynchorhina mauritaniensis Séret & Naylor, 2016 (False shark ray)

References

Rhinopristiformes
Taxa named by Friedrich Gustav Jakob Henle